Haplochrois coleophorella is a moth in the family Elachistidae. It was described by Sinev in 1993. It is found in Russia.

References

Natural History Museum Lepidoptera generic names catalog

Moths described in 1993
Elachistidae
Moths of Asia